Nikki Tamboli (born 21 August 1996) is an Indian actress from Maharashtra who primarily works in Telugu cinema, Tamil cinema and Hindi television. She participated in reality shows such as Bigg Boss 14 where she emerged as 2nd-runner up and Fear Factor: Khatron Ke Khiladi 11.

Early life
Tamboli was born in a Marathi family on 21 August 1996 in Aurangabad, Maharashtra.

Career

She started her career as a model. In 2019, she made her acting debut with the Telugu horror comedy film Chikati Gadilo Chithakotudu playing the role of Pooja.

Tamboli later made her Tamil debut in the action horror film Kanchana 3 as Divya. Her third film was Thipparaa Meesam in Telugu where she played Mounika. 

In 2020, she made her television debut through participating in the Hindi reality show Bigg Boss 14 where she finished at 3rd place, and got immense fame and appreciation during her stint on the show. 

In 2021, she participated in Colors TV's stunt-based reality show Fear Factor: Khatron Ke Khiladi 11, filmed in Cape Town where she finished at 10th place. Apart from reality shows she was also seen in several music videos collaboration with channels such as T-Series, Saregama and Desi Music Factory.

In 2022, she was seen in Colors TV's game show The Khatra Khatra Show which was hosted by Bharti Singh and Haarsh Limbachiyaa.

In the media 
Tamboli appeared in the Times of India's "Most Desirable Women on Television" list of 2020, where she was ranked 8th.

Filmography

Films

Television

Special appearances

Music videos

References

External links

1996 births
Living people
Actresses in Hindi television
Actresses in Telugu cinema
Bigg Boss (Hindi TV series) contestants
21st-century Indian actresses
Fear Factor: Khatron Ke Khiladi participants